The Rutherglen Reformer is a newspaper covering the Royal Burgh of Rutherglen, South Lanarkshire, a former Glasgow City Council area. It was established in 1875.

The paper is now owned by Reach plc and is printed weekly at the Press Buildings in Hamilton.

References

External links 
 Rutherglen Reformer Website

Newspapers published in Scotland
Rutherglen
Organisations based in South Lanarkshire
1875 establishments in Scotland
Newspapers established in 1875
Newspapers published by Reach plc